Agnes Loreta Loheni (born 1971) is a New Zealand politician and a former Member of Parliament in the House of Representatives for the New Zealand National Party. She was declared elected on 31 January 2019, following the resignation of Chris Finlayson.

Early life and career
Loheni was born in 1972 in Auckland, spending her formative years in Mount Albert. She lived in a state house with as many as 15 family members in just three bedrooms, and was educated at Marist College, Auckland. Loheni is a Samoan New Zealander. She is the eldest daughter of Fepulea'i Pelasio Loheni and Filomena Mata'utia Loheni (Mena Loheni). She also has three sisters named Jackie, Gina and Charlene. Agnes, her mother Mena, and her sisters ran a local Samoan fashion brand called MENA.

She is married and has five children. Loheni has a degree in chemical engineering from the University of Auckland. After graduating she had a two-year OE based in London and then returned to New Zealand where she focused on running the family business selling contemporary Pasifika fashion.

Political career

In  Loheni stood for the National Party in the  electorate and was placed 49 on National's party list. She was defeated by the incumbent Labour Member of Parliament William Sio, who won by a margin of 14,597 votes. Loheni was not ranked high enough on National's party list to be allocated a seat in parliament. In February 2018 Loheni and several other "next in line" list candidates attended National's parliamentary caucus meeting to help ease their transition into parliament should they enter during the course of the parliamentary term.

Loheni became a Member of Parliament on 31 January 2019, following the retirement of National MP Chris Finlayson, and was sworn in on 12 February. She was appointed as National's associate spokesperson for small business and associate spokesperson for Pacific people by leader Simon Bridges.

Loheni was instead selected to contest  for a second time.

During the 2020 New Zealand general election, Loheni contested Māngere a second time but was defeated by the Labour incumbent William Sio by a final margin of 19,396 votes. Due to National's landslide defeat, Loheni lost her seat in Parliament since she did not rank highly on the party list.

Views
Loheni has taken an anti-abortion stance. She served on the Abortion Legislation Select Committee to consider the Abortion Legislation Act 2020. Loheni wrote a minority report for the committee criticising the bill for what she considered its lack of safeguards on late-term abortions and foetal abnormalities.

References

1972 births
Living people
New Zealand people of Samoan descent
New Zealand National Party MPs
Members of the New Zealand House of Representatives
New Zealand list MPs
Unsuccessful candidates in the 2017 New Zealand general election
University of Auckland alumni
People educated at Marist College, Auckland
Unsuccessful candidates in the 2020 New Zealand general election